Naufragella is a genus of fungi in the family Halosphaeriaceae. The genus contains two species, Naufragella spinibarbata and Naufragella delmarensis.

References

Sordariomycetes genera
Microascales